Bocchoropsis is a genus of moths of the family Crambidae.

Species
Bocchoropsis pharaxalis (Druce, 1895)
Bocchoropsis plenilinealis (Dyar, 1917)

References

Spilomelinae
Crambidae genera
Taxa named by Hans Georg Amsel